Washington's 1st congressional district encompasses parts of King and Snohomish counties. The district covers several cities in the north of the Seattle metropolitan area, east of Interstate 5, including parts of Bellevue, Marysville, and up north towards Arlington.

In presidential elections, the 1st district has leaned Democratic. Under the old boundaries, Al Gore and John Kerry narrowly carried the district in 2000 and 2004, with 48% and 51% of the vote, respectively. In 2008, Barack Obama swept the district with 55.60% of the vote, while John McCain received 42%.  Similarly, Hillary Clinton won the district in 2016 with 54% of the vote over Donald Trump with 38%, and in 2020 Joe Biden polled 59% to 38% for Donald Trump.

History

Pre-2012

Prior to the 2012 redistricting, the district encompassed part of Northwest Seattle and largely suburban areas north and east of Seattle, including Shoreline, Edmonds, Lynnwood, Mountlake Terrace, Kenmore, Bothell, Kirkland, and Redmond, as well as Bainbridge Island and part of the Kitsap Peninsula. Until March 20, 2012, it was represented by Democrat Jay Inslee from Bainbridge Island. Inslee resigned to focus on his run for Governor of the state; the seat remained vacant until the special election that coincided with the November 2012 general election.

The former House seat of powerful U.S. Senator Warren G. Magnuson, the district was a swing district throughout much of the 1990s, changing hands and parties three times in four elections. Before the election of future U.S. Senator Maria Cantwell in 1992, the district had been in Republican hands for 40 years (and 42 of the previous 46 years). Since the 1998 election, when Inslee was first elected, the growing Democratic trend in the Seattle area enabled him to turn it into a fairly safe seat. He had been re-elected six times, with little difficulty, most recently in 2010.

Post-2012

The 2012 redistricting drastically changed the 1st district. Much of this area was previously part of the 2nd district, but in the new map, the 2nd has shrunk significantly. Jay Inslee (D) was the representative of the 1st district until resigning to run for governor of the state, but most of the district has been represented by Rick Larsen (D), of the 2nd district, in the past.

Soon after the 2012 general election polls closed, the Seattle Times and national news organizations called the district for Democrat Suzan DelBene, defeating Republican John Koster with a margin that the Seattle Times called "unexpectedly decisive", reflecting the difficulty of predicting the vote in the new district. The certified results confirmed her significant margin. DelBene also won the election for the remainder of Inslee's term in the old first district, and after being sworn in on November 13, 2012.

Recent election results from presidential races

List of members representing the district 
Beginning in 1909, members were elected from districted seats, instead of at-large statewide. (See .)

Recent election results

2010

2012 short term (2010 boundaries)

2012

2014

2016

2018

2020

2022

See also
2008 United States House of Representatives elections in Washington
2010 United States House of Representatives elections in Washington
2012 United States House of Representatives elections in Washington

Notes

References

 Congressional Biographical Directory of the United States 1774–present

External links
Washington State Redistricting Commission
Find your new congressional district: a searchable map, Seattle Times, January 13, 2012

01